Akçaalan (literally "quite white area") is a Turkish place name that may refer to several places in Turkey:

 Akçaalan, Bolu, a village in the district of Bolu, Bolu Province
 Akçaalan, Finike, a village in the district of Finike, Antalya Province
 Akçaalan, Göynük, a village in the district of Göynük, Bolu Province
 Akçaalan, Karaman, a village the district of Karaman, Karaman Province
 Akçaalan, Lapseki